Stallingsia maculosus, the manfreda giant skipper, is a species of giant skipper in the butterfly family Hesperiidae. It is found in Central America and North America.

The MONA or Hodges number for Stallingsia maculosus is 4152.

References

Further reading

 

Megathyminae
Articles created by Qbugbot